The 1942–43 Gauliga was the tenth season of the Gauliga, the first tier of the football league system in Germany from 1933 to 1945. It was the fourth season of the league held during the Second World War.

The league operated in twenty-nine regional divisions, four more than in the previous season, with the league containing 298 clubs all up, 33 more than the previous season. The  league champions entered the 1943 German football championship, won by Dresdner SC who defeated FV Saarbrücken 3–0 in the final. It was Dresden's first national championship and the club would go on to win the competition in the following season as well.

The 1942–43 season saw the ninth edition of the Tschammerpokal, now the DFB-Pokal. The 1943 edition was won by First Vienna FC, defeating Luftwaffe team LSV Hamburg 3–2 after extra time on 31 October 1943. It was the final edition of the Tschammerpokal, with the German cup not resuming until the 1950s, then under its current name.

The number of Gauligas, twenty-nine, increased by four compare to the previous season because of the sub-division of existing ones. The Gauliga Nordmark was split into the Gauliga Hamburg, Gauliga Mecklenburg and Gauliga Schleswig-Holstein while the Gauliga Bayern was split into the Gauliga Nordbayern and Gauliga Südbayern and the Gauliga Niedersachsen was split into the Gauliga Südhannover-Braunschweig and Gauliga Weser-Ems.

The 1942–43 season saw the continued participation of military and police teams, especially in the eastern regions. Gauliga champions like LSV Adler Deblin, LSV Reinicke Brieg and LSV Pütnitz were associated with the German air force, the Luftwaffe, LSV standing for Luftwaffen Sportverein while MSV Brünn was a club of the Wehrmacht. SG Warschau, in turn, was a club of the Ordnungspolizei, the uniformed police force in Nazi Germany.

In the part of Czechoslovakia annexed into Germany in March 1939, the Protectorate of Bohemia and Moravia, a separate Czech league continued to exist which was not part of the Gauliga system or the German championship.

Champions

The 1942–43 Gauliga champions qualified for the knock-out stages of the German championship. Holstein Kiel finished the tournament in third place, defeating First Vienna FC 4–1 in the third-place game while FV Saarbrücken and Dresdner SC contested the final which the latter won.

FC Schalke 04 won their tenth consecutive Gauliga title, Stuttgarter Kickers their fifth, VfB Königsberg and Kickers Offenbach their fourth while LSV Pütnitz, Germania Königshütte and First Vienna FC defended their 1941–42 Gauliga title.
 
‡ Gauliga champions LSV Adler Deblin were replaced in the German championship by SG Warschau.
† Both clubs finished on equal points and with the same goal average. The two clubs were declared joint Gauliga champions but VfB Stuttgart advanced to the German championship.
# Denotes Gauligas created through sub-division of existing Gauligas for the 1942–43 season.

German championship

References

Sources
 kicker-Almanach 1990  Yearbook of German football, publisher: kicker Sportmagazin, published: 1989, 
 100 Jahre Süddeutscher Fußball-Verband  100 Years of the Southern German Football Federation, publisher: SFV, published: 1997
 Die deutschen Gauligen 1933–45 – Heft 1–3  Tables of the Gauligas 1933–45, publisher: DSFS

External links
 Das Deutsche Fussball Archiv  Historic German league tables

1942-43
1
Ger